The 2016 Men's Pan-American Volleyball Cup was the eleventh edition of the annual men's volleyball tournament. It was held in Mexico City, Mexico from 21 to 26 May 2016 and played by ten countries.

Pools composition

Venue
Gimnasio Olímpico Juan de la Barrera, Mexico City

Pool standing procedure
 Number of matches won
 Match points
 Points ratio
 Sets ratio
 Result of the last match between the tied teams

Match won 3–0: 5 match points for the winner, 0 match points for the loser
Match won 3–1: 4 match points for the winner, 1 match point for the loser
Match won 3–2: 3 match points for the winner, 2 match points for the loser

Preliminary round
All times are Central Daylight Time (UTC−06:00).

Pool A

Pool B

Pool C

Final round
All times are Central Daylight Time (UTC−06:00).

Championship bracket

7th–10th places bracket

Classification 7th–10th

Quarterfinals

9th place match

7th place match

Semifinals

5th place match

3rd place match

Final

Final standing

Individual awards

Most Valuable Player
  Abrahan Alfonso Gavilán
Best Setter
  Matías Sánchez
Best Outside Hitters
  Jorge Barajas
  Vicente Parraguirre
Best Middle Blockers
  Fabián Flores
  Luis Sosa
Best Opposite
  Henry Tapia
Best Scorer
  Jorge Barajas
Best Server
  Gregory Petty
Best Libero
  Santiago Danani
Best Digger
  Santiago Danani
Best Receiver
  Santiago Danani

References

External links
Official website

Men's Pan-American Volleyball Cup
Men's Pan-American Volleyball Cup
Men's Pan-American Volleyball Cup
Pan-American Volleyball Cup
Sports competitions in Mexico City
May 2016 sports events in Mexico
2010s in Mexico City